West Camp is a hamlet in the Town of Saugerties, Ulster County, New York, United States. West Camp has a post office with ZIP code 12490.

References

Hamlets in Ulster County, New York
Hamlets in New York (state)